Laphria canis is a species of robber flies in the family Asilidae.

References

canis
Articles created by Qbugbot
Insects described in 1883
Taxa named by Samuel Wendell Williston